Cham Rahman (also Romanized as Cham Raḩmān; also known as Cham Rahmani) is a village in Hendijan-e Sharqi Rural District, in the Central District of Hendijan County, Khuzestan Province, Iran. At the 2006 census, its population was 75, in 15 families.

References 

Populated places in Hendijan County